"Mangiko" is a Greek and Yiddish folkloric tune hasaposerviko in the meter . 

Greek music and lyrics are by Kostas Karipis. The Yiddish music and lyrics are by Aaron Lebedeff. The song was also performed under the name "Chiftilareasa" by the Romanian music group Trei Parale.

See also
Hava Nagila
Hopak
Sirmpa
Külhanlı
Arabaci

References

External links

Greek songs
Turkish songs
Yiddish-language songs